William Kent (1685–1748) was an English architect, landscape architect and furniture designer.

William Kent may also refer to:

William Kent (Royal Navy officer) (1751 or 1760–1812), Royal Navy officer who served in New South Wales
William George Carlile Kent (1788–1871), Royal Navy officer who served in New South Wales
William Gustavus Kent (1837–1905), American politician from Iowa
William Kent (MP), English politician, MP for Devizes in 1614
William Saville-Kent (1845–1908), né William Kent, English marine biologist and murder suspect
William Kent (American politician) (1864–1928), United States Congressman representing California
William Kent (Irish politician), Fianna Fáil and Centre Party Cork Irish politician in 1920s and 1930s
William Kent (jurist) (1881/82–1946), Norwegian jurist and civil servant
Willie Kent (1936–2006), American singer
William H. Kent (1823–1889), Massachusetts politician
William H. Kent (scholar), wrote for the Catholic Encyclopedia
W. J. Kent (1860–1943), Canadian businessman and politician
William Richard Kent (1905–1964), Liberal party member of the Canadian House of Commons
William T. Kent (1886–1945), American stage and film actor
William Kent (artist) (1919–2012), American sculptor and printmaker
William Kent (historian of London) (1884–1963), British historian and author
William Kent (Australian politician) (1856–1906), member of the Queensland Legislative Assembly